"Black Man with a Horn" is a horror novella by American writer  T. E. D. Klein; part of the Cthulhu Mythos cycle, it was originally published in New Tales of the Cthulhu Mythos.

Plot

The story opens with a quotation from a letter written by Lovecraft on 7-23-'34. By omitting the word "kitten" it is made to suggest something hideous.

In the story, an author — whose literary career has been in the shadow of H. P. Lovecraft and modeled after Lovecraft Circle member Frank Belknap Long — becomes involved in a mystery after a chance encounter with a missionary named Mortimer while traveling on an airplane.  The missionary, traveling in disguise, is fleeing something he encountered while in Malaysia, and refers to the Chaucha.  

Later, while visiting a museum, the author comes across a reference to the Chaucha. The narrator realizes that the Chaucha are actually the Tcho-Tcho, which he had previously thought to be a fictional construct of Lovecraft. Slowly, the narrator becomes threatened by a being (possibly an avatar of Nyarlathotep) the Tcho-Tcho worship: a black, fish-like humanoid demon called the Shugoran (roughly "Questing Man") with an appendage that resembles a horn attached to its face. 

There are implications that the Tcho-Tcho have a practice of growing something within human bodies, a practice which results in the narrator's brush with a Malaysian on the airplane leaving a treacly smell on his clothing. Later, in a museum, the narrator smells the same treacly smell and is told that it is molasses - a pure culture used to grow things.  

The narrator's attempts to track down what has happened to Mortimer, after Mortimer goes missing during a hurricane. A disturbing clue turns up in his bedroom.

The story ends with his frightened next door neighbor having seen a black face at her window, something like a man wearing a gas mask or a snorkel. The narrator wonders how long it will be until the thing comes for him.

Publication history
New Tales of the Cthulhu Mythos (Arkham House, 1980)
Dark Gods (1985)
Cthulhu 2000: A Lovecraftian Anthology (Arkham House, 1995)
The Book of Cthulhu (Night Shade Books, 2011)

References

Cthulhu Mythos novels
Novels based on works by H. P. Lovecraft